This is a list of regions of Paraguay by Human Development Index as of 2021.

References 

Paraguay
Human Development Index
Governorates by Human Development Index